Kazuyoshi Torii (12 November 1946 – 9 February 2022) was a Japanese manga artist and university professor.

Life and career 
Born in Kamata, a defunct village today part of Okazaki, Torii started his career as an assistant of Fujio Akatsuka. He made his official debut as a mangaka in 1968 in Weekly Shōnen Sunday with the manga Kuchinashi Inu ("Dog With No Mouth"). He is best known for the provoking, taboo-free serializated manga  ("Professor Toilet"). The manga debuted in Weekly Shōnen Jump and sold over 10 million copies.

Besides his activity as an artist, Torii was a manga professor at the Aichi Shukutoku University.  He died of pancreatic cancer in Nagoya on 9 February 2022, at the age of 75.

References

External links
 Kazuyoshi Torii at Lambiek

1946 births
2022 deaths
Academic staff of Aichi Shukutoku University
Manga artists from Aichi Prefecture
Deaths from pancreatic cancer
Deaths from cancer in Japan